Adam Philip Cook (born 13 November 1979) is a former English cricketer.  Cook was a left-handed batsman who bowls right-arm off break.  He was born in Oxford, Oxfordshire.

Cook made his debut for Oxfordshire in the 1998 Minor Counties Championship against Shropshire.  Cook played Minor counties cricket for Oxfordshire from 1998 to 2008, which included 52 Minor Counties Championship matches and 24 MCCA Knockout Trophy matches.  He made his List A debut against the Durham Cricket Board in the 1999 NatWest Trophy.  He played 6 further List A matches, the last coming against Herefordshire in the 1st round of the 2004 Cheltenham & Gloucester Trophy which was held in 2003.  In his 7 List A matches he scored 131 runs at a batting average of 21.83, with a high score of 66.  This came against Herefordshire in the 2004 Cheltenham & Gloucester Trophy.  With the ball he took 6 wickets at a bowling average of 27.66, with best figures of 3/40.

He has previously played for the Middlesex Second XI.  His brother, Simon, played first-class cricket for Middlesex and Kent.

References

External links
Adam Cook at ESPNcricinfo
Adam Cook at CricketArchive

1979 births
Living people
Cricketers from Oxford
English cricketers
Oxfordshire cricketers